Salah Al Din is a rapid transit station on the Green Line of the Dubai Metro in the Deira area of Dubai, UAE.

The station opened as part of the Green Line on 9 September 2011.

The station is close to the Reef Mall and Al Ghurair Center. The station is also close to a number of bus routes.

See also
 Abu Bakr (name)
 Salah Al Din

References

Railway stations in the United Arab Emirates opened in 2011
Dubai Metro stations